Dave Richard Palmer  (born May 31, 1934) is a retired United States Army Lieutenant General who served as the 53rd Superintendent of the United States Military Academy (1986–1991), military historian and author, and former President of Walden University.  A 1956 graduate of West Point, he served two tours in the Vietnam War and numerous command positions during the height of the Cold War. He taught courses at both West Point and the Vietnamese National Military Academy.

Early life and education
Palmer was born in Ada, Oklahoma, on May 31, 1934.  He grew up in New York and Texas, receiving his appointment to the academy from Texas and graduating 37th in his class from West Point in 1956. He was commissioned a second lieutenant in the armor branch and embarked on a military career that spanned the Cold War era.  During his military career, Palmer received a master's degree in history from Duke University.

Military career
Palmer's initial assignment was as an armor officer in Berlin. He commanded a tank company in the 1st Armored Division, and would later command that same division. From 1969 to 1971, he commanded the 2nd Battalion, 33rd Armor in the 3rd Armored Division. His brigade command was of the 1st Brigade, 2nd Armored Division, Fort Hood, Texas, from 1976 to 1977. His career saw two tours in Vietnam; one of these consisted of serving on the faculty at the Vietnamese National Military Academy.

Palmer's staff and academic assignments included a tour as an instructor in the Department of Military Art and Engineering at West Point where he wrote The River and the Rock in 1969. He also served as the Deputy Commandant of the Army Command and General Staff College. He also served multiple assignments with the Joints Chiefs of Staff and Army staff at the Pentagon.

Decorations
  Army Distinguished Service Medal
  Defense Superior Service Medal
  Legion of Merit
  Bronze Star
  Air Medal
 |Vietnam Service Medal with three bronze service stars

Civilian career
Upon completion as his tour as West Point Superintendent, Palmer retired from the Army in 1991. He joined the Board of Directors of Walden University the following year. From 1995 to 1999, he served as president of Walden University, where he pioneered distance learning methods. Under Palmer's leadership, enrollment at the university doubled, and now has more than 10,000 students. From 1999 to 2000, he was Chief Executive Officer of Walden e-Learning, Incorporated.

Palmer has been a prolific author throughout his career and is recognized as a premier military historian.

Bibliography
River and the Rock: The History of Fortress West Point 1775-1783
The Way of the Fox; American Strategy in the War for America, 1775-1783 (Greenwood Press, 1975) 
Summons of Trumpet: US-Vietnam in Perspective (Presidio Press, 1978) 
Early American Wars and Military Institutions (Avery Pub. Group, 1986) 
1794: America, Its Army, and the Birth of the Nation (Presidio Press, 1994) 
George Washington and Benedict Arnold: A Tale of Two Patriots (Regnery Pub., 2006) 
George Washington's Military Genius (Regnery Pub., 2012)

References

External links
Portrait of General Palmer by Margaret Holland Sargent
Palmer discusses George Washington & Benedict Arnold: A Tale of Two Patriots at the Pritzker Military Museum & Library

Further reading

1934 births
Duke University alumni
United States Military Academy alumni
United States Army generals
Superintendents of the United States Military Academy
Living people
United States Army Command and General Staff College alumni
Recipients of the Air Medal
Recipients of the Distinguished Service Medal (US Army)
Recipients of the Legion of Merit
Recipients of the Defense Superior Service Medal
People from Ada, Oklahoma
American military historians
American male non-fiction writers